Josh Barrett may refer to:
 Josh Barrett (footballer) (born 1998), Irish footballer
 Josh Barrett (Home and Away), a fictional character from the Australian soap opera Home and Away
 Josh Barrett (American football) (born 1984), American football safety